Fredrik Torsteinbø (born 13 March 1991) is a Norwegian footballer who plays for Sandnes Ulf.

Club career 
He started his senior career in the Norwegian team Vidar  in 2009.

In 2011, he signed for Norwegian team Sandnes Ulf. He made his debut on 3 April 2011 against Bryne, they lost the game 0-1. He eventually established himself as a key player in the Rogaland-outfit, playing as a regular in the Norwegian highest division Eliteserien in 2012 and 2013.

In January 2014, Torsteinbø was presented as a new player for Hammarby IF in the Swedish second tier Superettan, being signed on a free transfer. In his first season at the club, he scored five goals and ten assists to help Hammarby achieve promotion to Allsvenskan, the top flight.

During the upcoming 2015 season he once again managed to score 5 goals as Hammarby finished 11th in the league. In the 2016 season he was used less regularly in the starting lineup, playing in an unusual position as a left defender during the first half of the campaign. However, he chose to renew his tie to the club in the middle of the season, signing a new contract that will last until the end of 2018.

On 20 July 2017, Torsteinbø completed a move back to his city of birth, Stavanger, by signing a contract with Viking until the end of 2020.

On 11 January 2023, Torsteinbø returned to Sandnes Ulf on a two-year contract.

Career statistics

Honours
Viking
1. divisjon: 2018
Norwegian Football Cup: 2019

References

External links

1991 births
Living people
Sportspeople from Stavanger
Norwegian footballers
Association football midfielders
FK Vidar players
Sandnes Ulf players
Hammarby Fotboll players
Viking FK players
Norwegian Second Division players
Norwegian First Division players
Eliteserien players
Superettan players
Allsvenskan players
Norwegian expatriate footballers
Expatriate footballers in Sweden
Norwegian expatriate sportspeople in Sweden